Ewa Farna (born 12 August 1993) is a Polish-Czech pop-rock singer. She released five Polish-language and four Czech-language studio albums, and received platinum and gold certifications for them, both in Poland and the Czech Republic. Farna is the youngest commercially successful singer in the Czech Republic. She was a judge on the Czech&Slovak SuperStar in 2013, the X Factor (Poland) in 2014, and is currently a judge on Idol (Poland).

Biography 
Farna was born on 12 August 1993 into a Polish family residing in the Vendryně village close to Třinec, Czech Republic. She attended a Polish elementary school in Vendryně, art school for five years and a Polish Gymnasium in Český Těšín. She also attended a dance school and learned to play the piano. Farna first attracted attention after winning local talent competitions in both the Czech Republic and Poland in 2004 and 2005. After being discovered by producer Lešek Wronka, she released her debut album Měls mě vůbec rád in 2006. This was followed by her winning the Objev roku ("Revelation of the Year") award in the 2006 for the Český slavík ("Czech Nightingale") national music poll. Her second album, Ticho, which peaked at number two in the Czech Republic, and the Polish version of her debut album, entitled Sam na Sam, were released in 2007. After a tour, the concert DVD Blíž ke hvězdám became the best-selling music DVD of 2008 in the Czech Republic. In early 2009, the Polish version of her second album was released as Cicho. Also, in 2010 Ewa was included in one episode of "Hela w opalach".

Her next album, Virtuální, was released on 26 October 2009, and her 2009–2010 tour Buď Virtuální started on 3 November 2009 in Brno and closed in Prague on 6 December 2009. The international leg of the tour also covered Poland and Slovakia. In 2010 Farna's Polish album "EWAkuacja" was released. The album received many awards including "Viva comet 2011" awards for both singles and the entire album. The singles from "EWAkuacja" are "Ewakuacja", "Bez Lez", and, later in 2011, "Nie przegap". 2011 was the year of Ewa's 18th birthday, so birthday concerts were held, one in the Czech republic, with a DVD "18 Live", and one in Poland with a DVD "Live, niezapomniany koncert urodzinowy". In October 2013, Farna's major comeback with her album "(W)Inna?" caused confusion. Many mistook the title to be a reference to Farna's 2012 car accident. In 2014 Ewa's Czech single "Leporelo" along with a music video, and the song "Lesek" about her manager Lesek Wronka, were released. In 2021, she ranked first in the category 'Best Female Singer' in the Czech music poll Český slavík.

Car crash
On 22 May 2012, Ewa Farna crashed her car between the towns of Třinec and Vendryně. She suffered only minor scratches. According to a breath test she was driving under the influence of alcohol, with a blood alcohol content level less than 1‰. She had been celebrating the passing of her matura the day before and fell asleep behind the wheel. She blamed this on exhaustion caused by a week-long cram session before the exam.

Personal life

Nationality
Ewa Farna hails from a patriotic Polish family from the Vendryně village in the Zaolzie region. Her father Tadeusz is a musician in regional Polish folk groups. Farna holds dual Polish-Czech citizenship although she has stated many times that she feels "as a proud Pole". She energetically campaigns for the rights of the Polish minority in the Czech Republic, often cooperating with the Congress of Poles in the Czech Republic.

Discography and charts

Albums

Singles

Other songs

Awards 
2008
 Srebrne Spinki award given by the General Consul of the Polish Republic in Ostrava for musical successes and promoting Polish minority from Zaolzie.
2009
 1st place in Opole Festival (Superjedynki): Album of the year – "Cicho"
 1st place in Sopot Hit Festival: Polish Hit of the Summer – "Cicho"

References

External links

 
 Ewa Farna official website 
 Ewa Farna official website 
 Ewa Farna official website 

1993 births
21st-century Polish women singers
21st-century Polish singers
21st-century Czech women singers
Czech pop singers
Living people
MTV Europe Music Award winners
Musicians from Třinec
Polish Lutherans
Polish people from Zaolzie
Polish pop singers
Polish rock singers
Polish actresses
Czech actresses
Czech television actresses
Polish television actresses
Polish soap opera actresses
Czech soap opera actresses